William Dunbar, M.A. (6 October 1661 – 7 January 1746) was a Scottish Episcopal clergyman who served as the Bishop of Moray and Ross (1727–35) and Bishop of Aberdeen (1733–1745).

He was consecrated at Edinburgh as the bishop of the dioceses of Moray and Ross on 18 June 1727 by Arthur Millar, Primus of the Scottish Episcopal Church, with bishops Gadderar and Rattray serving as co-consecrators. He also became the Bishop of the Diocese of Aberdeen on 5 June 1733, but retained Moray and Ross until 1735.

He resigned the see of Aberdeen on 4 July 1745 and died on 7 January 1746, aged 84.

References 

 
 
 
 

 
 

 
 
 

1661 births
1746 deaths
Bishops of Aberdeen
Bishops of Moray
Bishops of Ross (Scotland)